Ralph McPherran Kiner (October 27, 1922 – February 6, 2014) was an American Major League Baseball player and broadcaster. An outfielder, Kiner played for the Pittsburgh Pirates, Chicago Cubs, and Cleveland Indians from 1946 through 1955. Following his retirement, Kiner served from 1956 through 1960 as general manager of the Pacific Coast League San Diego Padres. He also served as an announcer for the New York Mets from the team's inception until his death. Though injuries forced his retirement from active play after 10 seasons, Kiner led all of his National League contemporaries in home runs between 1946 and 1952. He was elected to the Baseball Hall of Fame in 1975.

After his death, baseball writer Marty Noble named Kiner "one of baseball's genuine and most charming gentlemen".

Early life
Kiner was born in Santa Rita, New Mexico, and raised in Alhambra, California. He was of Pennsylvania Dutch (German) and Scots-Irish. He is the second cousin twice removed of Major League Baseball player for the New York Yankees, Isiah Kiner-Falefa.

World War II Service
Kiner served as a United States Navy pilot during World War II.

Kiner was inducted into the Navy during the spring of 1943. As a cadet, he attended St. Mary's Pre-Flight School in California and earned his pilot's wings and commission at Corpus Christi, Texas in December 1944. Kiner flew PBM Mariner flying boats on submarine patrols from Naval Air Station (NAS) Kaneohe Bay in Hawaii, accumulating 1,200 flying hours. Kiner enlisted the day after Pearl Harbor.

Playing career (1946–1955)
Kiner made his major league debut on April 12, 1946, with the Pittsburgh Pirates. He finished the season with 23 home runs, but 109 strikeouts. After the season, the Pirates convinced future Hall of Famer Hank Greenberg not to retire. Greenberg gave Kiner hours of instruction, and in 1947, Kiner led the major leagues with 51 home runs while striking out fewer than 100 times. Many of Kiner's homers were hit into a shortened left-field and left-center-field porch at Forbes Field (originally built for Greenberg and known in the press as "Greenberg Gardens"); the porch was retained for Kiner and redubbed "Kiner's Korner". Kiner would later use "Kiner's Korner" as the title of his post-game TV show in New York.

In 1949, Kiner topped his 1947 total with 54 home runs, falling just two short of Hack Wilson's then-National League record. It was the highest total in the major leagues from 1939 to 1960, and the highest National League total from 1931 to 1997. It made Kiner the first National League player with two 50 plus home run seasons. Kiner also matched his peak of 127 RBIs. From 1947 to 1951, Kiner topped 40 home runs and 100 RBIs each season. Through 2011 he was one of seven major leaguers to have had at least four 30-HR, 100-RBI seasons in their first five years, along with Chuck Klein, Joe DiMaggio, Ted Williams, Mark Teixeira, Albert Pujols, Ryan Howard and Ryan Braun.

Kiner's string of seasons leading the league in home runs reached seven in 1952, when he hit 37. This also was the last of a record six consecutive seasons in which he led Major League Baseball in home runs, all under the guidance of manager Billy Meyer and Pirate great Honus Wagner. He was selected to participate in the All-Star Game in six straight seasons, 1948 to 1953.

The equally famous "Home run hitters drive Cadillacs and singles hitters drive Fords," frequently misattributed to Kiner himself, was, by his own account, actually coined by teammate Fritz Ostermueller.  Footage of Kiner hitting a home run in Forbes Field can be seen in the 1951 film Angels in the Outfield.

On June 4, 1953, Kiner was sent to the Chicago Cubs as part of a ten-player trade.  The Pirates traded Kiner, Joe Garagiola, George Metkovich, and Howie Pollet to the Cubs in exchange for Bob Addis, Toby Atwell, George Freese, Gene Hermanski, Bob Schultz, Preston Ward, and $150,000.  This was largely due to continued salary disputes with Pirates general manager Branch Rickey, who reportedly told Kiner, "We finished last with you, we can finish last without you."

Kiner played the rest of 1953 and all of 1954 with the Cubs, finishing his career with the Cleveland Indians in 1955. A back injury forced him to retire at the age of 32, finishing his career with 369 home runs, 1,015 runs batted in and a .279 lifetime batting average. He hit better than .300 three times, with a career best .313 with the Pirates in 1947.

Broadcasting career (1961–2013)

In 1961, Kiner entered the broadcast booth for the Chicago White Sox. The following year, Kiner, Lindsey Nelson, and Bob Murphy began broadcasting the games of the expansion New York Mets on WOR-TV in New York City. The trio rotated announcing duties. Kiner also hosted a post-game show known as "Kiner's Korner" on WOR-TV. Nationally, he helped call the Mets' appearance in the 1969 and 1973 World Series for NBC Radio. He won a local Emmy Award for his broadcasting work.

Kiner was known for his occasional malapropisms, usually connected with getting people's names wrong, such as calling broadcasting partner Tim McCarver as "Tim MacArthur" and calling Gary Carter "Gary Cooper". He even once called himself "Ralph Korner".

Despite a bout with Bell's palsy, which left him with slightly slurred speech, Kiner continued broadcasting for 53 seasons. Kiner's tenure with the Mets was the third-longest for an active broadcaster with a single team as of his final season. He is the third longest-tenured broadcaster in baseball history, trailing only Los Angeles Dodgers announcers Vin Scully (1950–2016) and Jaime Jarrín (1959–present). His traditional home run call—"It is gone, goodbye," was a signature phrase in baseball.

As illness reduced his appearances, Kiner featured less frequently on SportsNet New York (SNY) and WPIX, which currently televise Mets games.  During these visits (usually once a week), regular announcers Gary Cohen, Keith Hernandez, and Ron Darling would welcome Kiner as he shared stories of the Golden Age of baseball, as well as the contemporary game. During his final season in 2013, he was the oldest active announcer in Major League Baseball.

Personal life
Partly owing, as Kiner once said, to the fact that Hollywood megastar Bing Crosby was part-owner of the Pirates, Kiner was often closely linked with the likes of celebrities such as Crosby's colleague Bob Hope and Frank Sinatra, but even more to publicized romances, dates or photos with leading ladies, such as Elizabeth Taylor, Ava Gardner and Janet Leigh.

Kiner was married four times; his first spouse was 1950s tennis star Nancy Chaffee, 1951–1968.

Kiner was also married to Barbara (née George) Kiner, from 1969 to 1980; and to DiAnn Kiner from 1982 until her death in 2004.

In his 80s, Kiner married, then divorced, Ann Benisch.

Death
Ralph Kiner died from natural causes in Rancho Mirage, California, on February 6, 2014, at the age of 91. Upon his death, New York Mets owner Fred Wilpon said, "Ralph Kiner was one of the most beloved people in Mets history - an original Met and extraordinary gentleman." At the time of his death, Kiner had been battling Bell's palsy, and the effects of a stroke that he had suffered a decade prior that forced him to reduce his broadcast schedule to a handful of games a season.

On February 21, 2014, an online Twitter petition was started to rename Citi Field Sections 132–134 as 'Kiner's Korner', to commemorate the 52-year Mets career of Ralph Kiner. As of March 29, 2014, the petition had over 5,000 followers.

Legacy

Kiner was inducted into the Baseball Hall of Fame in 1975. Kiner had garnered 273 votes by the Baseball Writers' Association of America, one more than the minimum required for election. It was in his final year of eligibility (his 13th, as no vote was held in 1963 and 1965), and it was the closest call possible for any player elected by the BBWAA. (He would have had a chance later with the Veterans Committee had he not been elected by the BBWAA). Kiner was also the only player voted in that year. He attended every Hall of Fame ceremony from the time he was inducted until his death.

Kiner was elected to the New York Mets Hall of Fame in 1984.

The Pittsburgh Pirates retired his uniform number 4 on September 19, 1987.

The Sporting News placed him at number 90 on its 1999 list of "The 100 Greatest Baseball Players, and he was one of the 100 finalists for the Major League Baseball All-Century Team that year. The Mets honored him with an on-field ceremony on "Ralph Kiner Night" at Shea Stadium on Saturday, July 14, 2007. On that night, fans were given photos of Kiner. Franchise icon Tom Seaver gave a commemorative speech recalling Kiner's legacy. Other guests of note were Yogi Berra, Bob Feller, and broadcaster Ernie Harwell. To honor his tenure, the Mets announced that the home broadcast booth at future home Citi Field would be named for Kiner (the booth at Shea had previously been named for him in 2002). As a present from the Mets, Kiner received a cruise of his choice.

In 2013, the Bob Feller Act of Valor Award honored Kiner as one of 37 Baseball Hall of Fame members for his service in the United States Navy during World War II.

In 2014, the Mets "retired" Kiner's broadcast microphone and added a logo featuring his name, dates and a vintage broadcast microphone to the left-field wall at Citi Field. They also wore patches with the logo for the season. The logo was later moved from the wall to the stadium's top tier alongside the franchise's other non-player honorees.

See also 

 50 home run club
 List of Major League Baseball players to hit for the cycle
 List of Major League Baseball home run records
 List of Major League Baseball career home run leaders
 List of Major League Baseball career runs batted in leaders
 List of Major League Baseball annual runs batted in leaders
 List of Major League Baseball annual home run leaders
 List of Major League Baseball annual runs scored leaders
 Major League Baseball titles leaders

References

https://www.nj.com/yankees/2022/04/the-secret-is-out-disrespected-yankees-shortstop-is-related-to-a-hall-of-fame-slugger-and-beloved-mets-legend.html

Further reading
 Famous Kiner quotes at Baseball Almanac

External links

 

, or Rotowire, or Retrosheet
 
 

1922 births
2014 deaths
American people of German descent
Albany Senators players
Baseball players from New Mexico
Chicago Cubs players
Chicago White Sox announcers
Cleveland Indians players
Major League Baseball broadcasters
Major League Baseball left fielders
Major League Baseball players with retired numbers
Minor league baseball executives
National Baseball Hall of Fame inductees
National League All-Stars
National League home run champions
National League RBI champions
United States Navy pilots of World War II
New York Mets announcers
Sportspeople from Alhambra, California
People from Santa Rita, New Mexico
People from Rancho Mirage, California
Pittsburgh Pirates players
Toronto Maple Leafs (International League) players
American sportsmen
Military personnel from California